The 1997 Montreal Alouettes finished in second place in the East Division with a 13–5 record. Their season came to a close as the Doug Flutie-led Toronto Argonauts defeated the Alouettes in the Eastern Final. The 1997 team saw major head office changes as Jim Speros sold the team to Bob Wetenhall and Larry Smith assumed the role of president and chief executive officer after resigning as CFL commissioner.

Offseason

CFL draft

Ottawa Rough Riders Dispersal Draft

Preseason

Regular season

Season Standings

Season Schedule

Roster

Playoffs

East Semi-Final

East Final

Awards

1997 CFL All-Star Selections
Neal Fort – Offensive Tackle
Uzooma Okeke – Offensive Tackle
Elfrid Payton – Defensive End
Doug petersen – Defensive Tackle
Mike Pringle – Running Back
Pierre Vercheval – Offensive Guard

References

1997 Canadian Football League season by team
Montreal Alouettes seasons
1990s in Montreal
1997 in Quebec